Li Fengbiao (born October 1959) is a general (Shangjiang) of the People's Liberation Army (PLA). He is the current political commissar of the Western Theater Command, one of the five military regions of the People's Liberation Army. He is a member of the 19th CPC Central Committee.

Biography
Li was born in Anxin County, Hebei, in October 1959. He enlisted in the People's Liberation Army in 1978. He was chief of staff of the 15th Airborne Corps in 2007 before serving as commander of the 15th Army (now People's Liberation Army Air Force Airborne Corps) in July 2011. In December 2014, he was assigned deputy commander of the Chengdu Military Region, one of seven military districts in China. In January 2016, he was appointed deputy commander and chief of staff of the newly founded Central Theater Command. He was commander of the People's Liberation Army Strategic Support Force in April 2019, and held that office until June 2021, when he was appointed political commissar of the Western Theater Command.

He was promoted to the rank of major general (Shaojiang) in 2008, lieutenant general (zhongjiang) in July 2016, and general (Shangjiang) in December 2019.

References

1959 births
Living people
People from Anxin County
People's Liberation Army generals from Hebei
Political commissars of Western Theater Command
People's Republic of China politicians from Hebei
Chinese Communist Party politicians from Hebei
Members of the 19th Central Committee of the Chinese Communist Party